Goring & Streatley railway station is on the Great Western Main Line serving the twin villages of Goring-on-Thames, Oxfordshire and Streatley, Berkshire in England. The station is in Goring-on-Thames, adjacent to the village centre and some five minutes walk from Goring and Streatley Bridge, which connects the village with Streatley, across the River Thames. It is served by local services operated by Great Western Railway (GWR).

The station has two side platforms (platform 1 on the down main line and platform 4 on the up relief line) and a central island platform with two faces (platform 2 on the up main line and platform 3 on the down relief line). Platforms 1 and 2 are only used when engineering works cause stopping trains to use the fast tracks, and the platform edges are closed off by fences incorporating normally closed (but not locked) gates.

The main station building is to the east of the station, alongside platform 4 and on the opposite side of the station to the village centre. There is a large car park to the south of the station building. There are also two pedestrian entrances onto platform 1, one of which links directly to Goring village centre. Access between the platforms is via a footbridge, accessed by steps and lifts from all platforms.

History
The station was on the original line of the Great Western Railway, on the section between Reading and Steventon that opened on 1 June 1840. In 1892, Moulsford station was closed and replaced by the current Cholsey station. Goring station was renamed Goring & Streatley on 9 November 1895 to prevent confusion with Goring-By-Sea.

Preparation for the electrification of the line between Paddington and Bristol/Oxford required raised clearances and hence the replacement of the old footbridge. Following a strong local campaign led by the mobility group MIGGS (Mobility Issues Group for Goring and Streatley), Network Rail included lifts in the new footbridge, which was opened in June 2016. These changes also resulted in the demolition of the former ladies waiting room and toilet block on the island platform.  The ticket office, toilets and waiting rooms are only open when the station is staffed in the mornings (Mondays to Saturdays).  There is a bus stop in the road immediately outside the ticket office, with local buses running to Cleeve, South & North Stoke and Wallingford (Mondays to Saturdays) operated by Going Forward Buses CIC.

Services
The typical off-peak service from the station is every 30 minutes in each direction with an hourly service on Sundays. There are also additional semi-fast services to and from Paddington during morning and evening peak hours on weekdays, and also some through diesel trains between Reading and Oxford.

Typical journey times are approximately 15 minutes to Didcot Parkway and Reading, 40 minutes to Oxford, and approximately 1 hour 15 minutes (50 minutes by semi-fast weekday peak services) to London Paddington.

Gallery

References

Bibliography

 
 

Railway stations in Oxfordshire
DfT Category E stations
Former Great Western Railway stations
Railway stations in Great Britain opened in 1840
Railway stations served by Great Western Railway
Great Western Main Line